Eremophila victoriae is small shrub with sessile, egg-shaped leaves and purple flowers and that is endemic to Western Australia. It is only known from two populations in the Great Victoria Desert.

Description
Its branches are grey and covered with glandular hairs. The four stamens are enclosed in the petal tube with glandular hairs on the filaments. Flowering mainly occurs from August to October but also at other times after rainfall.

Taxonomy and naming 
This species was first formally described in 2016 by Bevan Buirchell and Andrew Phillip Brown in the journal Nuytsia from specimens collected in the Great Vicotria Desert in 2010. The specific epithet (victoriae) is a reference to the type location.

Distribution and habitat
Eremophila victoriae is only known from two populations in the Great Victoria Desert where it grows in mulga country.

Conservation
Eremophila victoriae classified as "Priority One" by the Government of Western Australia Department of Parks and Wildlife, meaning that it is known from only one or a few locations which are potentially at risk.

References

Eudicots of Western Australia
victoriae
Rosids of Western Australia
Endemic flora of Western Australia
Plants described in 2016
Taxa named by Bevan Buirchell
Taxa named by Andrew Phillip Brown